Syed Asif Ibrahim (born 28 September 1953) is an Indian diplomat and a former director of the Intelligence Bureau, the main internal intelligence agency of India. He held the position of director from 1 January 2013 to 31 December 2014. He was the first Muslim in India to hold this important position. He is an Indian Police Service (IPS) officer of Madhya Pradesh cadre and belongs to its 1977 batch.

In June 2015, he was appointed as Indian Prime Minister's special envoy on "Countering Terrorism and Extremism" with a charter to liaise with governments of West Asian countries, and Afghanistan and Pakistan.

See also
 Syed Akbaruddin

References

Living people
1953 births
Jawaharlal Nehru University alumni
Directors of Intelligence Bureau (India)
Indian police chiefs
People from Madhya Pradesh
Indian diplomats